Metamorpho (Rex Mason) is a superhero appearing in American comic books published by DC Comics. He was created in 1965 by writer Bob Haney and artist Ramona Fradon.

Metamorpho is a founding member of the Outsiders, and has also joined multiple incarnations of the Justice League. The character has been moderately popular since his introduction in 1965. Originally adventurer Rex Mason, he is converted into a man made of a shifting mass of chemicals after being cursed by an ancient artifact that he has retrieved.

Publication history
Metamorpho's creator, Bob Haney, had seen success with DC Comics in 1964 with the titles Metal Men and Doom Patrol, featuring bands of superheroes exhibiting fantastic powers. Under the editorial management of George Kashdan, Haney was asked to capitalize on these titles' popularity with a similar character. Metamorpho, the Element Man, debuted in The Brave and the Bold #57 (January 1965).

As first conceived, Metamorpho was a parody of the fantastic characters that populated comic books in the 1960s. Artist Ramona Fradon was coaxed out of maternity retirement to illustrate Metamorpho's first appearances. The popularity of Metamorpho's appearances in The Brave and the Bold led to a 17-issue ongoing series between 1965 and 1968. Metamorpho also appeared during this time in two issues of Justice League of America (#42 and #44) and became the second superhero to decline an invitation to join that organization (Adam Strange being the first), though he did become a reservist, eventually being called in during a Justice League/Justice Society crossover to help find and rescue the Seven Soldiers of Victory.

Metamorpho appears on the cover of Aquaman #30 as one of the pallbearers (along with Batman, Hawkman, and Superman) at the "Sea King's Funeral". Metamorpho also appears in a series of backup stories in Action Comics #413–418 and World's Finest Comics #218–220 and #229.

In 1975, Metamorpho appeared in 1st Issue Special #3, a brief anthology series consisting of one-shots. That issue was written by Bob Haney and illustrated by Ramona Fradon, Metamorpho's creators. Haney and Fradon had met at the 1974 San Diego Comic-Con, and while reminiscing, it emerged that both of them regarded Metamorpho as one of the features they'd most enjoyed working on, leading them to ask DC if they could do one more Metamorpho story together. Fradon later commented: "I think we both felt that Metamorpho was our baby. I never had an experience like I had working with Bob Haney on Metamorpho. It was like our minds were in perfect synch ... it was one of those wonderful collaborations that doesn't happen very often".

After becoming a charter member of the Outsiders in 1983, and member of the European branch of the Justice League International, Metamorpho received his own four-issue mini-series in 1993. In 2005, DC Comics reprinted Metamorpho's early The Brave and the Bold appearances and the entirety of the 1965 series as one of the company's volumes of Showcase Presents. In 2007, Dan Jurgens launched the six-issue series Metamorpho: Year One.

As part of a Wednesday Comics, Neil Gaiman wrote a 12-page Metamorpho story that Mike Allred illustrated. In 2016 he starred in a new comic book series titled DC's Legends of Tomorrow.

Fictional character biography
Rex Mason is an adventurer who is hired by Stagg Enterprises CEO, Simon Stagg, to retrieve a rare Egyptian artifact, the Orb of Ra. Shortly after hiring him, Simon Stagg learns that Mason has been dating his daughter, Sapphire Stagg. This and other incidents begin to fuel in Stagg a dislike for Mason that ultimately leads to a plot to kill him.

In an Egyptian pyramid, Rex Mason is knocked unconscious by Simon's brutish bodyguard Java and is eventually exposed to a radioactive meteorite from which the Orb of Ra was fashioned. A tremendous flare-up of its radiation transforms Mason into Metamorpho, the Element Man. He gains the ability to shapeshift and change himself into any element or combination of elements found in the human body. It is also established in his origin story in The Brave & The Bold #57 that Metamorpho is virtually invulnerable in his inert (untransformed) state, when Stagg, afraid that Rex is going to kill him, shoots him point-blank without effect. The Orb of Ra, however, has the same effect on Rex that kryptonite has on Superman. Thus Stagg continues to control Metamorpho using the Orb. Later, it is revealed that Mason is but one of many metamorphae. They were created by the sun god Ra, using the meteorite, to serve as warriors in his battle against the god Apep, "the serpent who never dies".

Metamorpho, unlike most super-humanoids described in DC Comics, cannot assume a normal, fully human appearance, being no longer composed of flesh, blood and bone. As such, he regards his metamorphic powers as a disease and seeks a cure for his condition. Because he considers himself a freak and wishes only to be restored to his former human state, he rejects an offer of membership from the Justice League of America in JLA #42. Green Lantern attempts to change him back using his power ring, but due to a "yellow" component of the meteorite radiation, is unable to make him normal again.

Metamorpho briefly has a crimefighting partner named Urania "Rainie" Blackwell, a woman who deliberately exposed herself to the Orb to gain its powers. She calls herself Element Girl (nicknamed "the Chemical Doll") and works with him on a number of cases.

Issues #16–17 were intended to show a new direction for the series, with Sapphire marrying a man named Wally Bannister and Metamorpho joining a mysterious Mr. Shadow to deal with an immortal queen. Bent on world conquest, the queen (an exact lookalike of Sapphire) marries Metamorpho. She later steps outside her mystic city and instantly ages 2,000 years. When Wally Bannister is murdered by Algon (a metamorph who has lived for centuries in a depowered state), Metamorpho is framed. Instead of coming to his defense against the false accusations, Metamorpho's colleague Mr. Shadow comes forth as an enemy. It is revealed that Mr. Shadow was attempting to enslave Metamorpho all along. Metamorpho is tried and convicted by a jury of rabble and is then executed by absolute zero, the first of what will become a series of multiple if temporary deaths.

Element Girl revives Metamorpho, and Algon, the real murderer, is killed by molten lava minerals in an attempt to regain his burned-out powers. It is later learned that Mr. Bannister's murder was actually engineered by the villainous Prosecutor, who is then killed by an insectoid villain in a cocoon. At this point, issue #17 ends, and the story is never continued.

Metamorpho reappears years later in The Brave and the Bold #101 (April–May 1972). It is revealed that Metamorpho had spent the period after the end of his own series immersed in a painful chemical bath concocted by Stagg in an attempt to cure his condition. Stagg retrieves him from this "cure" too early because he needs Mason to save his endangered daughter Sapphire. Metamorpho stars in a new backup series beginning in Action #413 (June 1972). There is no reference in this revival series to the events or characters of his previous two issues.

Urania Blackwell, unreferenced since the end of the regular series, is later revealed to have ended her partnership with Metamorpho when her unrequited attraction to him became too much for her. Blackwell's powers are removed at her own request by Ra, resulting in her death; the episode, in Neil Gaiman's Sandman, involves Death. Death mentions Algon's death in passing, trying to convince Blackwell that she will not live forever.

Outsiders
Metamorpho spends some time working with the Outsiders. While in the despotically ruled nation Mozombia, Metamorpho is subdued and disassembled. The tyrant's forces keep him inert with a constant application of radiation. He is freed by Katana's indestructible sword, which had been latched onto a live electrical wire. While leaving Mozombia, the Outsiders' plane is shot down by the Bad Samaritan. Metamorpho and the others spend some time stranded on a deserted island, simply too far away from land to rescue themselves.

Metamorpho perishes for the second time during the Millennium event. Doctor Jace, the scientific adviser to the Outsiders, has decided that life with the more logical Manhunters is preferable and she betrays the team; they fight back, but Metamorpho has been brainwashed into assisting Jace. He is killed in the resulting battle. He is again revived during the Invasion miniseries, when a gene-bomb set off by invading aliens affects his biomass.

Justice League
Metamorpho spends some time with the Justice League, including Justice League Europe. During this period he encounters Sapphire Stagg again. He becomes involved in a battle with the Metal Men, who have been tricked by Simon Stagg. His League friends, Rocket Red and Animal Man, are at the site of the battle, but are being detained by Java. At the conclusion of the battle, Metamorpho learns he had a son with Sapphire, but the baby boy's touch harms all but Sapphire and Metamorpho. When Java holds the baby, his arms melt. Metamorpho hands the baby over to Simon, who immediately fears he will be affected like Java was moments before and die. However, something in his genetic structure protects him, just as it did with Sapphire. Simon's stance softens and everyone is set free. Doc Magnus, the leader of the Metal Men, offers his services in creating new arms for Java. On the way home, Metamorpho's friends are puzzled as to how he knew Simon would be unaffected by the child. Metamorpho indicates that he hoped the baby would kill Simon.

Later, Metamorpho has a romantic relationship with Crimson Fox, which is cut short by her apparent murder. His personal investigation of the incident uncovers multiple layers of lies and deceit. During his time with the team, while fighting the planet-smashing aliens called The Family, Metamorpho is hit by a powerful energy blast that destroys his body. He quickly re-forms in a totally different look. He will sport this new look until his next demise.

Third death and return
When the Hyperclan attacked the Justice League of America's orbiting base, destroying it, Metamorpho protects three of his teammates, Nuklon, Obsidian, and the original Icemaiden, in a giant, fluid filled ball. The intent is for them to survive reentry into Earth's atmosphere. The three make it, injured but alive, but Metamorpho does not. He is buried with solemn honors. He is temporarily resurrected by the wish-granting Id (fundamentally flawed because the wisher, his son Joey, only wished for him to be back rather than to be alive). Later, he is definitively brought back to life by Sapphire Stagg using the Orb of Ra, and he briefly joined the Doom Patrol.

Shortly thereafter, an accident with one of Simon Stagg's experiments turns Simon, Sapphire, and Joey into an energy being, and causes Metamorpho to take on the form and personality of Java. "Java" kidnaps Black Canary, asking for her help in rescuing the others. With Canary's help, he becomes Metamorpho again and manages to return the others to their normal forms.

Outsiders / "Shift"
At the same time, Metamorpho has seemingly been appearing in the Outsiders (vol. 3) series, but Rex Mason informs the team that their "Metamorpho" is a regrown fragment of his own body. Rex attempts to reassimilate his "twin", but the Outsiders convince him that the twin deserves the chance to lead his own life. This second Metamorpho chose the name "Shift" and develops a relationship with Indigo. When she dies, he becomes depressed over her death. After the events of One Year Later, Shift willingly chooses to be reassimilated into Metamorpho, because he has killed several people. Rex steps in to fill Shift's position in the Outsiders. A full account of Shift's crimes is explained in the Outsiders (vol. 3) Annual; he had inadvertently killed 44 people during Black Lightning's escape from Iron Heights Penitentiary.

Metamorpho continues to serve on the Outsiders when Batman takes over, and after its further restructuring following Batman's apparent death. He is apparently killed yet again alongside the rest of the team in a satellite explosion orchestrated by Talia al Ghul.

The New 52
In The New 52, one story reveals that the Outsiders are revealed to have survived. It is stated that Metamorpho was able to save the team by the same technique he previously used to rescue the Justice League during the Hyperclan's attack. He is also shown as one of the candidates for the new Justice League International, but is ultimately not chosen.

DC Rebirth
In the Watchmen sequel Doomsday Clock, Metamorpho is featured on the news as an apparent example of the "Superman Theory", in which the government is thought to have been experimenting on humans to give them superpowers.

Metamorpho is transmuted into Nth Metal by Simon Stagg as part of his plot to open the portal to the Dark Multiverse. While trying to get Simon Stagg to close the portal with the help of Plastic Man, Mister Terrific is sucked in to the portal with Plastic Man and Metamorpho. Plastic Man shields the others from the Dark Multiverse energy, which he is immune to. Upon arriving on a lifeless world they encounter Phantom Girl, who is trapped in her intangible form and has no knowledge she has been sending a signal. When the four of them find a computer in the gut of a dead giant creature, they are greeted by a hologram of Tom Strong who states that they are needed to save the universe. Mister Terrific, Plastic Man, and Metamorpho learn from Phantom Girl that she has been stuck in intangible form since she was a child. After the four of them make it back to their world, Mister Terrific tries to leave the three of them at Simon Stagg's compound only to be drawn back to them. Mister Terrific concludes some bond created by the effects of the Dark Multiverse energy prevents them from going their separate ways.

Stuck with the other heroes at Simon Stagg's residence, Metamorpho gives Sapphire an ultimatum to fully commit to their relationship after years of being duped by her father. She fires back with his physical insecurities, and the situation is unresolved along with Java adding tension. Simultaneously, the Terrifics take on Rex's fellow element man Algon, who plants to turn everyone in the world into element people. In the process of defeating him by using the Orb of Ra, Rex is turned human again. The Terrifics disband after learning that Java was Doctor Dread all along. Afterwards, Rex slowly comes to feel he is dull and worthless without his heroic role. On purpose, Rex and Element Dog sneak into Stagg Industries and use the Orb of Ra to return to their elemental forms. They rejoin the other heroes to fight Doctor Dread's Dreadfuls. Subsequently, Rex is made chief security officer at Stagg Industries, and his relationship with Sapphire is repaired.

Powers and abilities
Metamorpho has the ability to transmute his body into a wide variety of elemental compounds and form them at will. Originally, he was limited to elements that were naturally found in the human body. Somehow, this limitation seems to have disappeared. He can stretch, bounce, elongate, and reform himself like rubber or plastic. Rex is able to alter the consistences of these chemical elements and combines them into complex compounds. Metamorpho could reshape parts or the whole of his body. Rex's body provides him with natural armor, offering damage resistance from blunt and energy attacks. He is also a skilled martial artist, archaeologist, and detective.

Enemies
Besides dealing with Simon Stagg and Java, Metamorpho had his own rogues gallery in his comics:

 Achille La Heele - A casino owner who claims Metamorpho from Simon Stagg.
 Ahk-Ton - A priest during the time of Ramses II who had the same powers as the Orb of Ra.
 Algon - A Metamorph from Ancient Rome.
 Cha-Cha Chavez - A South American playboy and dictator of his unnamed homeland.
 Doc Dread - A costumed criminal and gang leader.
 Edifice K. Bulwark - An architect, chemist, engineer, and self-proclaimed "Big Builder" who Simon Stagg once transformed into a Metamorpho to use its abilities to build a special building.
 El Matanzas - A dictator who used his futuristic robots to rule a South American valley full of cavepeople.
 Franz Zorb - A scientist assigned to restore Metamorpho back to Rex Mason only for his experiment to be a cover for the manufacturing of his Chemo-Robots.
 Chemo-Robots - Six elemental robots created by Franz Zorb.
 Hafnium - A Chemo-Robot.
 Osmium - A Chemo-Robot.
 Selenium - A Chemo-Robot.
 Strontium - A Chemo-Robot.
 Tantalum - A Chemo-Robot.
 Thallium - A Chemo-Robot.
 Jezeba - The Queen of Fury from the hidden African valley of Ma-Poor who is familiar with Algon's history.
 Jillian Conway - An archaeologist and former colleague of Rex Mason who was also exposed to the Orb of Ra which made her appearance less human.
 Kurt Vornak - A former lab assistant of Simon Stagg who was turned into a being of pure atomic energy in a plot to finish an experiment by Stagg that went wrong.
 Maxwell Tremaine - A criminal scientist and former Nazi.
 Nicholas Balkan - A criminal who sought to use the Telstar satellite to assist in his criminal empire.
 Gunther - One of Nicholas Balkan's sons.
 Lothar - One of Nicholas Balkan's sons.
 Siegfried - One of Nicholas Balkan's sons.
 Otto von Stuttgart - A criminal who captured Simon Stagg and 11 vulcanologists with plans to threaten the world with a neutron dissolver.
 Phantom of Washington - Achille Destinee is a French soldier who worked for Napoleon and Benjamin Franklin before getting killed during the American Revolution. His ghost took on the alias of the Phantom of Washington who appeared before people like Abraham Lincoln, Woodrow Wilson, and Franklin D. Roosevelt ever since he came in contact with an Egyptian artifact.
 Prosecutor - A fanatic criminal who framed Metamorpho for Wally Bannister's murder.
 Stingaree - A criminal mastermind who is the leader of the Cyclops Organization.
 T.T. Trumbull - An entrepreneur and engineer who plotted to destroy Metamorpho and blackmail the United States of America from his secret Science Station Alpha in the Grand Canyon.
 Thunderer - A pint-size demagogue from an unnamed alien dimension.
 Neutrog - The henchman of Thunderer.
 Vrag-Kol - A criminal who led his gang into posing as invading aliens.

Other versions

Justice
Rex Mason/Metamorpho appears in the 12-issue mini-series Justice, as a member of the Justice League.

JLA: The Nail
In the Elseworlds story JLA: The Nail, an unstable Metamorpho is forced to kill the Thinker by the unknown mastermind behind the recent anti-metahuman propaganda. He later attacks Lexcorp tower in Metropolis, but J'onn J'onzz intercepts the attack, Metamorpho weakly explaining that someone forced him to kill by threatening his family, before he dies as a result of their enemy's attempt to brainwash him.

In the sequel JLA: Another Nail, the Outsiders are shown trying to find traces of his essence in the hope that he can be brought back to life, but they are interrupted by the current threat before they can determine if this is actually possible.

DC: The New Frontier
In Darwyn Cooke's 12-issue series, DC: The New Frontier, Metamorpho appears with the rest of the Justice League at the end of the series.

Smallville Season Eleven
Metamorpho is featured in the Smallville Season Eleven digital comic based on the TV series. He is a member of the Outsiders.

Batman: Arkham Knight
In Batman: Arkham Knight prequel comic, Metamorpho is the result of a project named Project: Meta, an attempt to turn mud obtained from Clayface into weaponry by Stagg Enterprises. Upon seeing Batman and Deadshot snooping around his lab, the project's head scientist opens fire on the pair with a laser rifle, hitting the tank storing Metamorpho and freeing it. After a brief fight which results in Metamorpho escaping into Stagg Enterprises' parking lot, Batman is engulfed. Using his line launcher, Batman escapes and throw three sonic Batarangs into its body which explode inside it. Batman then takes some samples for later study.

Injustice: Gods Among Us
Metamorpho appears in Injustice: Gods Among Uss prequel comic. He is depicted as a member of High Councillor Superman's Regime. In Year Four when Plastic Man breaks into the Regime's underwater prison to rescue his son, he is confronted by Metamorpho, who is the prison warden. Before Metamorpho can act, Plastic Man teleports him, his son and all of the prison's inmates to a mirror dimension using some of Mirror Master's technology. In Year Five after Deathstroke breaks into S.T.A.R. Labs to get the Mother Box for Batman and Lex Luthor, he is greeted by Metamorpho before he can leave. This results in Metamorpho's death after a tense fight against Deathstroke.

In other media
Television
DC Animated Universe

 Metamorpho appeared in the Justice League two-part episode "Metamorphosis", voiced by Tom Sizemore. This version's powers are the result of a super soldier mutagen and is an old Marine friend of John Stewart. After discovering Mason is secretly engaged to his daughter Sapphire Stagg, Simon Stagg and his bodyguard Java trap him into Stagg's genetic experimental chamber and transform him into Metamorpho. Simon then manipulates Metamorpho fighting Stewart under the belief that the latter stole his fiancée. After Sapphire clears up the misunderstanding, Mason teams up with Stewart and the Justice League to stop a monstrous creature inadvertently unleashed by him and Simon.
 Metamorpho makes non-speaking appearances in Justice League Unlimited as a member of the expanded Justice League.

Other
 Metamorpho appears in Batman: The Brave and the Bold, voiced by Scott Menville. This version is a teenager and member of the Outsiders.
 Metamorpho appears in Beware the Batman, voiced by Adam Baldwin. Similar to the DCAU incarnation, this version's powers are the result of mutagens.
 Metamorpho appears as a background character in DC Super Hero Girls.
 Metamorpho appears in the Young Justice episode "Exceptional Human Beings", voiced by Fred Tatasciore. This version is a member of Batman Inc. and experiences constant pain as a side effect of using his powers, though he has learned to live with it.

Film
 Metamorpho makes a cameo appearance at the end of Justice League: The New Frontier.
 An evil version of Metamorpho named Megamorpho''' makes a cameo appearance in Justice League: Crisis on Two Earths as a minor member of the Crime Syndicate.
 Metamorpho appeared in Teen Titans Go! To the Movies.

Miscellaneous
 Metamorpho appears in issue #31 of the Justice League Unlimited spin-off comic book.
 Metamorpho appears in the 1975 spin-off of the Justice League of America'' Peter Pan Records (Power Records) LP, in a solo audio action adventure called "Metamorpho — The Element Man — Fumo, The Fire Giant".

References

External links
 Metamorpho at Comic Vine

Comics characters introduced in 1965
1965 comics debuts
Fictional alchemists
Fictional archaeologists
Fictional private investigators
Fictional United States Marine Corps personnel
Fictional characters who can duplicate themselves
Fictional characters who can stretch themselves
Fictional characters with elemental transmutation abilities
Fictional characters with immortality
Fictional characters with superhuman durability or invulnerability
DC Comics characters who are shapeshifters
DC Comics characters with accelerated healing
DC Comics characters with superhuman strength
DC Comics male superheroes
DC Comics martial artists
DC Comics metahumans
DC Comics military personnel
DC Comics titles
Characters created by Bob Haney